Sheila Mary Florance (24 July 1916 – 12 October 1991) was an Australian theatre, television and film actress. She was best known for her performance as elderly, alcoholic convict Lizzie Birdsworth in the television series Prisoner.

Florance, born in Melbourne, Victoria, married an Englishman in 1934 and sailed to London. She spent World War II in England. Her early career was based on the London stage. Her first husband died in action following the 1944 Normandy landings.

Returning to Australia in 1948, where she started performing locally as a theatre actress, before entering films and television series. Florance had a reputation as a teller of extraordinary stories and in the 1950s she was known for her house parties. Florance died in 1991 from lung cancer, a week after receiving the AACTA Award for Best Actress in a Leading Role for her final film.

Biography

Early life

Florance was born on 24 July 1916 at 42 Carrington Grove, East St Kilda, Melbourne. She was the eldest daughter of costumier Frances Josephine (née Lalor) and school teacher James Horn Florance. Educated at Presentation College, Windsor, she left school aged 15 and with her father's support she began to take an interest in acting. To further her theatrical ambitions she took small parts with the Melbourne Little Theatre at St Chad's in South Yarra.
One of her first successes was in February 1935 when she appeared in John Hastings Turner's play The Spot on the Sun, which was staged by and starred visiting English actress Ada Reeve.

First marriage and move to England 

On 19 April 1934, at the age of 17 and following a whirlwind romance, Florance married visiting Englishman Roger Lightfoot Oyston at Holy Angels Catholic Church, Balaclava. The following year, Florance and Oyston had a daughter, Susan. The family travelled to England, where they lodged briefly with Roger's parents in Deepdale Avenue,  Scarborough, Yorkshire, before moving to a house in Shaftesbury Avenue, Bridlington. The couple's first son, Peter was born on 20 May 1938.

With war in Europe looming, Roger enlisted in the Green Howards as an officer cadet and received his commission to the 2nd Derbyshire Yeomanry in July 1941. Florance joined the Women's Land Army and moved to live and work on a farm near Bempton. She often recounted a tale in which she had a second daughter, Bridget, who was blown out of her arms during an air raid on Bristol in 1941, leading to Florance requiring psychiatric care. No record of Bridget's birth or death has survived, and her eldest son Peter was never able to confirm the story.

In 1942, Susan and Peter were sent away to boarding schools but later returned to Mill Farm. In June 1944, Roger Oyston, now a captain in the 2nd Derbyshire Yeomanry, was second in command of C squadron. He landed in France as part of the Invasion of Normandy and went missing in action around Escoville near Pegasus Bridge on 19 June 1944. Florance was informed that her husband was missing but she did not receive the telegram informing of his death until the following year. The couple's second son, Philip Michael, was born in September 1944. After returning to Australia, Florance often told stories that while in Britain she had worked with Emlyn Williams' company British Drama League, the Council for the Encouragement of Music and the Arts (CEMA) and the Oxford Repertory Company. She also said she had worked with Noël Coward, Robert Donat and Dame Sybil Thorndike.

Second marriage and return to Australia 

After the war, Florance met Polish airman John (Jan) Adam Balawaider who had served in the Royal Air Force with 158 squadron until he was badly injured during an attack on Wanne-Eickel on 2 February 1945. On 3 September 1946, he and Florance married at Holy Cross Church in Hucknall, Nottingham.

The couple decided to leave Britain for Australia. There were complications; having married Balawaider, Florance had acquired Polish nationality and was classified as an alien. Balawaider had war service credentials and was able to fly ahead to Australia, but Florance had to deal with official obstacles before she and the three children could embark on the Aberdeen & Commonwealth Line vessel Esperance Bay on 6 March 1948. On arrival in Fremantle, Peter Oyston recalls that his mother "ran down the gangplank ahead of everyone else and against the orders of the Captain or the crew, and knelt on the soil in the port, and then grabbed a handful of gravel and started eating it, and saying, 'Oh, Australia, Australia, I'm home, I'm home. My lovely country'" Florance was soon reunited with her husband and the family moved into a run-down wooden cottage in Prahran, a suburb of Melbourne.

Around 1954, parties were held at Florance's house, referred to as 'The Hovel'. According to Peter Oyston: over those years my sister and I worked out that we had 82 callers a week, not counting those who came more than once. It was constant open house. My stepfather would start a party with his muso friends while my mother was at the theatre. And then my mother would bring back the cast and any people who came to see the shows. And the taxi drivers and, if the police called to quieten us up, then the police would be invited in and they'd join the party too. It really was an extraordinary time.

In March 1954, Florance's 18-year-old daughter Susan Oyston fell from the roof of the nine-storey National Bank building in Collins Street, Melbourne, where she worked. Florance said at the time she believed the fall was accidental, saying, "She had her bags all packed to go to Cairns for a holiday, and was looking forward to it eagerly ... She often went [onto the roof] in the early morning, and in her lunch-hour to enjoy the sunshine and the breeze". She later told interviewer Sam Newman she thought it was probably suicide and that she had failed her daughter. Some time after Florance's own death, evidence emerged that Susan Oyston may have been murdered.

When Florance stopped working on Prisoner in 1983 she hoped to spend a last couple of years with her husband John, who had suffered much of his life from injuries sustained during the war. He was now seriously unwell and died from cancer in October of that year.

Death

Sheila Florance died aged 75 on 12 October 1991, nine days after her son Philip had represented her at Sydney Opera House to receive on her behalf the Best Actress in a Leading Role award  for her role in her final film, A Woman's Tale. Her friend and colleague Bud Tingwell wrote her obituary and said, "nothing I write can express properly the admiration and love for Sheila Florance felt by so many of us who knew her ... This week at a service of celebration for Sheila Florance in St Kilda, Melbourne, where she was born and lived, the church was packed. She had a full house and a standing ovation."

Career

Theatre

1950s

After her return to Australia, Florance rejoined Melbourne's Little Theatre and in August 1951 she appeared in Guy Bolton's Larger than Life. In February – March 1953, she toured Victoria with Arrow Theatre's well-received production of Thornton Wilder's Our Town. Playing Mrs Gibbs, Florance accrued 63 performances in the eight-week tour. By January 1954, Florance had joined the newly formed Union Theatre Repertory Company—Australia's first professional repertory company—and was immediately lauded for her portrayal of the mischievous aunt in Lesley Storm's The Day's Mischief. Florance worked with many actors who later became household names, including Barry Humphries and his mentor, Peter O'Shaughnessy.

As well as her work with the Union Theatre, Florance continued to perform with the Little Theatre, Her performance as Teresa Browne with Moira Carleton and Syd Conabere in the first Australian production of Graham Greene's The Living Room (26 October 1954 – 6 November 1954) was described as "outstanding and perfect in gentle pathos". The following year she was back at the Union Theatre in Mel Dinelli's The Man (14 November 1955 – 26 November 1955). One reviewer wrote, "as the incredible Mrs. Gillis, Sheila Florance stressed incredibility for all she was worth".

Florance continued to perform with both theatre groups through the rest of the decade, in plays including Elizabeth Addyman's The Secret Tent (14 Jan 1956 – 8 February 1956) at the Arrow Theatre, Reginald Denham's Ladies in Retirement (20 February 1956 – 3 March 1956), William Inge's romance Picnic (5 March 1956 – 17 March 1956), Emlyn Williams' The Light of Heart (29 October 1956 – 10 November 1956), and George Bernard Shaw's ironic comedy Misalliance (3 December 1956 – 15 December 1956) at the Union Theatre. In 1956, Florance played Cassandra in Christopher Fry's adaptation of Jean Giraudoux's Tiger at the Gates, at the opening of the newly built theatre complex on St Martin's Lane. Florance's final theatrical performance of the 1950s was as widow Julia Rajk in Robert Ardrey's Shadow of Heroes (September – October 1959), for which she was awarded The Melbourne Newspaper Critics' Circle Erik Kuttner memorial trophy for best actress 1959.

1960s

Florance continued working in theatre, although she spent less time there. She produced well-regarded work and was nominated a second time for the Melbourne Critics Award (Erik) for her performance in Eugène Ionesco's The Chairs (1960) at the Little Theatre. By 1961, Florance had left Channel 2 to concentrate on repertory. A string of performances at the Union Theatre followed; including Ferenc Molnár's comedy The Guardsman (4 September 1961 – 23 September 1961), William Inge's The Dark at the Top of the Stairs (25 September 1961 – 14 October 1961), and Bram Stoker's Dracula (8 January 1962 – 3 February 1962) with Neil Fitzpatrick and Patsy King, who later appeared with Florance in many episodes of Prisoner.

In 1962, Florance realised one of her theatrical ambitions in the Union Theatre's production of William Shakespeare's Macbeth (6 February 1962 – 3 March 1962), which starred Frank Thring in the title role and Florance as Lady Macbeth. Thring and Florance were old friends; they performed opposite each other in Oedipus Rex and in The Guardsman. He was a regular guest at her parties, but there had always been tension between them on stage. Florance appeared in three more plays in 1962; Fritz Hochwälder's The Public Prosecutor (12 April 1962 – 5 May 1962) with Peter Adams, at the Little Theatre, Ray Lawler's Summer of the Seventeenth Doll (4 June 1962 – July 1962) with Carol Armstrong, Bunney Brooke and Syd Conabere at Russell Street Theatre, and Michael Redgrave's adaptation of Henry James' The Aspern Papers (24 September 1962 – 13 October 1962) with Gina Curtis, Marion Edward and Reg Livermore at the Union Theatre.

In March 1963, she toured Victoria in the Union Theatre Repertory Company's double bill of George Bernard Shaw's Balkan satire Arms and the Man and Peter Batey's bush-life farce The No-Hopers (6 March 1963 – 10 April 1963). At the renamed St Martin's Theatre (formerly the Little Theatre), she appeared in her last play for a few years; Fay and Michael Kanin's adaptation of Ryūnosuke Akutagawa's Rashomon (5 February 1964 – 29 February 1964).

The intermittent nature of Bellbird allowed Florance to continue with her theatrical work. She was a founder member of the short-lived Melbourne Independent Theatre Company, which staged a single production, Brian Faull's Life for the Living (15 May 1967 – 27 May 1967) at the Emerald Hill Theatre before disbanding. Later the same year, Florance appeared at St Martin's Theatre in Harold Pinter's The Birthday Party (1 November 1967 – 25 November 1967) alongside Peter Adams. In February 1968, Florance appeared with the St Martin's Theatre company in Thomas Keneally's Halloran's Little Boat (5 February 1968 – 17 February 1968) alongside Terence Donovan at the Playhouse Theatre, Perth. as part of the Festival of Perth, and then in Melbourne at St Martin's Theatre. Lillian Hellman's The Little Foxes (22 May 1968 – 15 June 1968) alongside Syd Conabere at St Martin's Theatre was Florance's last play of the 1960s.

1970s
Florance's theatre work in the 1970s included a lavish production of William Shakespeare's comedy All's Well That Ends Well directed by Sir Tyrone Guthrie, which opened at the Princess Theatre, Melbourne (21 October 1970 – 14 November 1970). The production travelled to Canberra (18 November 1970 – 21 November 1970), before a final performance at the Octagon Theatre, Crawley, Western Australia, as part of the Festival of Perth. In 1972, she was selected to perform with Sid James in Sam Cree's farce The Mating Season at the Comedy Theatre.

In 1973, Florance performed in Neil Simon's The Prisoner of Second Avenue (12 June 1973 – 21 July 1973) with Monica Maughan at Melbourne's Russell Street Theatre, Louis Esson's The Time is Not Yet Ripe (7 November 1973 – 1 December 1973) with Elspeth Ballantyne at the Comedy Theatre, Melbourne, and Noël Coward's morality play Design for Living (11 December 1973 – 19 January 1974) with  Peter Curtin at St Martin's Theatre. Continuing a run of plays into 1974, Florance appeared in Edward Bond's comedy drama The Sea (23 April 1974 – 1 June 1974) with Sandy Gore and Bruce Myles at Russell Street Theatre, and George Bernard Shaw's problem play The Doctor's Dilemma (27 August 1974 – 5 October 1974) at St Martin's Theatre.

1980s

In 1987, Florance appeared in two theatre productions; Uncle Vanya (24 June 1987 – August 1987) with Alex Menglet at the Anthill Theatre, South Melbourne, and Sha Yexin's satire The Impostor (11 September 1987 – 26 September 1987) with Reg Evans and Bud Tingwell at, what had become, St Martins Youth Arts Centre; this was her last theatre performance.

Film and television
In 1959, Florance was working as a floor manager at television station Channel 2; she said she was only doing one play a year during her holidays to keep her "nose in the theatre". Television enticed her into playing a small part in episode "Mind over Matter" of Emergency (1959 TV series) with Brian James. In late 1962 and early 1963 she played defendants Laura Radford and Jocelyn Matthews in two episodes of Seven Network's semi-improvisational courtroom television series Consider Your Verdict.

In 1965, Florance appeared in her first film role as a deaf-mute in Giorgio Mangiamele's art film Clay, and in post-production she dubbed the voice of lead actress Janina Lebedew, who played Margot.
Florance also made her first appearance in popular police procedural television series Homicide. She also appeared in Dangerous Corner, a television movie written by J. B. Priestley, an episode ("The Stand-In") of children's series The Magic Boomerang, and in Patrick Barton's television adaptation of Peter Ustinov's Romanoff and Juliet. In 1967, Florance started to appear intermittently as Dossie Rumsey in long-running soap opera Bellbird. She continued her occasional roles in Bellbird and Homicide into the 1970s, and also began to take small roles in other television productions such as Division 4.

In 1971, Florance played a minor role as Old Mrs Bacon in the film Country Town, a movie version of Bellbird that featured many members of the television cast. Also in 1971, Florance made the first of her four appearances as town matriarch Grace Falconer in police drama series Matlock Police. She also gave a performance with Beverley Dunn in Anton Chekhov's Uncle Vanya (23 June 1971) at St Martin's Theatre.

In 1973, she played Lorna Russell in the first episode of Ryan with Pamela Stephenson and Rod Mullinar, before playing Tony's (Jack Thompson) mother in Tim Burstall's 1974 film, Petersen. Apart from single-episode appearances in Tandarra (1976), Bluey (1977), and Bobby Dazzler (1978), for much of the rest of the decade, Florance concentrated on film work.

Florance played Mavis Lipton in Tim Burstall's thriller End Play (1976). This was followed by her first film role in writer-director Paul Cox's first full-length feature, Illuminations (1976). It was a relatively small role but it led to further collaborations. In the same year, Florance played Mrs Sullivan in the multi-award-winning Fred Schepisi film The Devil's Playground (1976). A small appearance in Australian western Raw Deal (1977) followed, and then the part of Mrs Gleeson in Ken Hannam's atmospheric mystery, Summerfield (1977).

In 1979, Florance appeared as May Swaisey—an elderly farm owner and friend of protagonist Max—in George Miller's hugely successful dystopian action film Mad Max. In the film Florance was required to wield an antique shotgun, but whilst filming and running with the heavy gun, she stepped into a hole and broke her knee. She was back on set a few days later to finish her scenes with her leg and hip in plaster.

After taking some time off following her husband John's death, Florance returned to television with a small role as Esme in an episode of Winners (1985). Next came roles in two Paul Cox productions; Margaret's mother in Handle With Care (1985), and Martha in Cactus (1986). This was followed by two parts playing grandmothers; Roger Scholes' thriller The Tale of Ruby Rose (1987) featuring Melita Jurisic, Chris Haywood, Rod Zuanic and Martyn Sanderson; and Luigi Acquisto drama Hungry Heart (1987). Florance also took part in Kick Start (1987), a short comedy (34 min) with Tim Scally and directed by Charles Sandford. It won the Best Fiction (Greater Union) and Rouben Mamoulian Awards at the 1987 Sydney Film Festival.

Florance ended the 1980s with performances in television movie Becca (1988) as Old Becca, and as Madame Fortune in an episode of children's fantasy Round the Twist (1989).

Prisoner

Florance became best known for her portrayal of recalcitrant, alcoholic murderer—discovered during the series to be innocent—Elizabeth Josephine (Lizzie) Birdsworth in Reg Watson's women's prison drama Prisoner in 1979. Initially conceived as a sixteen-episode stand-alone series, the favourable reception led the Reg Grundy Organisation to develop the show into an ongoing soap opera. Florance was the only original actress who was cast without an audition; Watson saw her photograph and her list of credits, and offered her the role. Initially, Lizzie was a background role, but by 1980 had become a main character alongside Doreen (Colette Mann) and Bea Smith (Val Lehman), and Florance became a household name. She won two Logie Awards; as Best Lead Actress in a Series in 1981, and Best Supporting Actress in a Series in 1983.  She was with the show from episode one until episode 418, which was broadcast in 1984. By that time, she had appeared in 403 episodes. Florance also starred with other cast members in Prisoner in Concert (1981), a spin-off comedy musical production that was filmed at Pentridge Prison in Coburg, Victoria.

In 1990, a British Prisoner fan club arranged for Florance to visit the United Kingdom to appear in their 'On the Outside' tour. Florance arrived with fellow cast member Amanda Muggleton, and the pair were extremely well received. They were mobbed at the airport; Florance said, "Oh my goodness me. I didn't dream of it. I've never had anything like that in my whole life". Florance and Val Lehman were given a civic reception by the Mayor of Derby on 22 August, an occasion that was poignant for Florance because her first husband had been in the Derbyshire Yeomanry. At this time Florance was already unwell, and while on the tour had to have a large tumour removed. Despite this setback, she was back on tour within days.

1990s

In 1990, Florance appeared as a character named Molly in an educational film about juvenile deliquency, Nirvana Street Murder (1990), a low-budget enterprise that featured Mary Coustas, Mark Little, Ben Mendelsohn and Roberto Micale. She followed this with a small part in Golden Braid (1990) directed by Paul Cox, in which Florance was cast as "Lady with clock".

Florance's last film, A Woman's Tale (1991), was written especially for her by Paul Cox and Barry Dickens as a tribute to Florance after learning she was dying of cancer. Florance, now a septuagenarian, played a genteel, elderly woman called Martha, who lived alone with her few prized possessions. Martha guarded her independence and reminisced with her visiting nurse Anna (Gosia Dobrowolska) while dying of cancer. The film also starred Norman Kaye as her neighbour Billy who had dementia, and Chris Haywood as her son Jonathan. Florance's performance was widely praised both within Australia, and internationally following the film's release. Florance herself was fighting cancer during the filming. Cox said, in an interview with Richard Phillips:

I had a terrific friendship with Sheila Florance. In fact she acted in my very first film, and we always used to joke that I would make her a star. When I heard suddenly that she was dying of cancer I visited her immediately. There was no sentimentality or anything on her part—she was an incredible woman—but she said jokingly, 'There is still time to turn me into a star, but let's be quick.' I went home and spent three days and three nights writing the script and then with Barry Dickins and Sheila we did another draft. She was given eight weeks to live and so we made A Woman's Tale with this hanging over us. This motivated us, of course, but Sheila had a degree of greatness about her. She was a very powerful woman. It was an amazing challenge to make a film about life, in the face of death. To get the money of course was impossible and I had to pawn everything I had. People have asked me how we did it but to some extent we were idiotically courageous in taking this risk. Sheila and I joked all the time. I would say to Sheila, "Please don't die on me or you'll kill me". She would reply, "Don't worry I'll be a good girl."

The film was well received; it won Florance the AACTA Award for Best Actress in a Leading Role and won Cox the Grand Prix at the Ghent International Film Festival in 1992.

Filmography

Notes and references

Notes

References

External links 

Sheila Florance Collection in the Performing Arts Collection, Arts Centre Melbourne.
Sheila Florance's entry in AusStage

1916 births
1991 deaths
20th-century Australian actresses
Actresses from Melbourne
Australian film actresses
Australian people of Irish descent
Australian Roman Catholics
Australian soap opera actresses
Australian stage actresses
Deaths from cancer in Victoria (Australia)
Best Actress AACTA Award winners
Logie Award winners
People from St Kilda, Victoria
Australian expatriate actors
Australian expatriates in England